Jingle All the Way is a 1996 film starring Arnold Schwarzenegger.

Jingle All the Way may also refer to:
 One of the lyrics of the song "Jingle Bells"
 Jingle All the Way 2, a sequel to the 1996 film
 Jingle All the Way (2011 film), a stop motion animated television special
 Jingle All the Way (Béla Fleck and the Flecktones album)
 Jingle All the Way (Crash Test Dummies album)
 Jingle All the Way (Austrian Death Machine album)